The Chicago Theme is an album by flautist Hubert Laws recorded at Rudy Van Gelder's Studio in New Jersey in 1974 and released in 1975 on the CTI label.

Reception
The Allmusic review by Scott Yanow awarded the album 3 stars stating "Rather than performing with a small group, as he did on his best sessions, Laws is joined by strings and funky rhythm sections playing now-dated commercial grooves... The only reason to acquire this out of print LP is for Laws' still-superb flute playing".

Track listing
All compositions by Hubert Laws except as indicated
 "The Chicago Theme (Love Loop)" (Bob James) - 5:38 
 "Midnight at the Oasis" (David Nichtern) - 5:31 
 "You Make Me Feel Brand New" (Thom Bell, Linda Creed) - 5:54 
 "Going Home" (Antonín Dvořák) - 4:56 
 "I Had a Dream" - 6:02 
 "Inflation Chaser" - 6:48 
Recorded at Van Gelder Studio in Englewood Cliffs, New Jersey between January and April, 1975

Personnel
Hubert Laws - flute, arranger 
Randy Brecker - trumpet
Michael Brecker - tenor saxophone
David Sanborn - alto saxophone
Bob James - keyboards, arranger, conductor
Don Grolnick - piano, clavinet
Joe Beck, George Benson, Eric Gale, Richie Resnicoff, Phil Upchurch - guitar
Doug Bascomb, Ron Carter - bass
Stanley Clarke - electric bass
Steve Gadd, Andrew Smith - drums 
Ralph MacDonald - percussion
Harry Cykman, Gayle Dixon, Max Ellen, Paul Gershman, Emanuel Green, Harold Kohon, Charles Libove, Harry Lookofsky, David Nadien, Matthew Raimondi - violin
Al Brown, Manny Vardi - viola
George Ricci, Alan Shulman - cello

References

 

1975 albums
CTI Records albums
Hubert Laws albums
Albums produced by Creed Taylor
Albums recorded at Van Gelder Studio